Carlos Oliveira (born 12 September 1943) is a Portuguese rower. He competed in the men's double sculls event at the 1972 Summer Olympics.

References

1943 births
Living people
Portuguese male rowers
Olympic rowers of Portugal
Rowers at the 1972 Summer Olympics
Place of birth missing (living people)